Cambodian League 2, formerly the Cambodian Second League, is the second tier professional football league in Cambodia managed by the Cambodian Football League Company (CFLC). It was first started in 2016 by the Football Federation of Cambodia. The winners from each of the 6 regions of the third level, the Regional League (North, South, East, West, Middle, and Phnom Penh), and from the Hun Sen Cup are qualified to play in the Cambodian League 2. Winner of the Cambodian League 2 will be promoted to the top division Cambodian Premier League the following season.

2022 season and clubs

Championship history

2016–2021 Cambodian Second League

2022–present Cambodian League 2

 Bold denotes team earned promotion.

Championships by club

Notes

References

 
Football competitions in Cambodia